Harter Hill may refer to one of two elevations in Herkimer County, New York:

 Harter Hill (Warren, New York)
 Harter Hill (Newport, New York)